The heats for the women's 50 m freestyle race at the 2009 World Championships took place on the morning of 1 August and the final took place in the evening session of 2 August at the Foro Italico in Rome, Italy.

Records

The following records were established during the competition:

Results

Heats

Semifinals

Final

External links 
Heats results
Semifinals results
Final results

Freestyle Women's 50 m
2009 in women's swimming